Solo–Superia was a Belgian professional cycling team that existed from 1961 to 1966. Its main sponsor was Belgian margarine manufacturer Solo. Its most notable wins were the 1965 Paris–Roubaix with Rik Van Looy and the 1966 Tour of Flanders with Edward Sels.

References

External links

Cycling teams based in Belgium
Defunct cycling teams based in Belgium
1961 establishments in Belgium
1966 disestablishments in Belgium
Cycling teams established in 1961
Cycling teams disestablished in 1966